Eugène Julien Martineau (born 14 May 1980 in Heerlen, Limburg) is a Dutch decathlete.

Achievements

External links

1980 births
Living people
Dutch decathletes
Olympic athletes of the Netherlands
Athletes (track and field) at the 2004 Summer Olympics
Athletes (track and field) at the 2008 Summer Olympics
World Athletics Championships athletes for the Netherlands
Sportspeople from Heerlen
Dutch people of Aruban descent